Another Intensity is the fourth LP released by the Reggae artist Gentleman. The Far East Band takes part in the achievement of this album.

Track listing 
 "Evolution" - 3:49
 "Tranquility (Acoustic)" - 3:19
 "Lack Of Love" (Feat. Sizzla) - 4:01
 "Different Places" - 3:55
 "Round The World" - 4:07
 "Serenity" - 4:08
 "Soulfood" - 3:51
 "Celebration" (Feat. Alborosie) - 4:01
 "Mount Zion" (Feat. IAM) - 3:40
 "The Light Within" (Feat. Diana King) - 3:56
 "In Pursuit Of Happiness" - 3:52
 "Rage & Anger" - 3:11
 "Respond To Yourself" - 4:32
 "Missing Those Days" - 3:38
 "Hosanna" - 4:51
 "Jah Love" (Feat. Jack Radics, Daddy Rings) - 3:55
 "Sin City" - 8:16

2007 albums
Gentleman (musician) albums